The long-winged antwren (Myrmotherula longipennis) is a species of bird in the family Thamnophilidae. It is found in Bolivia, Brazil, Colombia, Ecuador, French Guiana, Guyana, Peru, Suriname, and Venezuela. Its natural habitat is subtropical or tropical moist lowland forests.

The long-winged antwren was described by the Austrian ornithologist August von Pelzeln in 1868 and given its current binomial name Myrmotherula longipennis.

References

long-winged antwren
Birds of the Amazon Basin
Birds of the Guianas
long-winged antwren
Birds of Brazil
Taxonomy articles created by Polbot